The Speaker of the House of Representatives of Thailand is the presiding officer of the lower chamber of the National Assembly of Thailand. The Speaker of the House of Representatives is also the ex officio President of the National Assembly of Thailand. The Speaker of the House of Representatives is an MP, usually from the majority party in the House of Representatives. The Speaker or the President is elected at the beginning of a House session immediately after an election, there are no term limits for the office.

The office of the Speaker was first established in 1932, with the establishment of the first legislature of Thailand. The office of the President of the People's Assembly of Siam was first occupied by Chaophraya Thammasakmontri (Sanan Thephasadin na Ayutthaya).

The Speaker is entrusted with certain legislative powers, as it is his main role to ensure all the legislative process is followed. The Speaker is assisted by two Deputy Speakers. The Speaker must act impartially on all matters and therefore cannot be a member of an executive committee of a political party, this also apply to his deputies.

His duties include:
 Filling a vacancy of a Party list MP, by submitting a name on the list for publication in the Royal Gazette.
 Submitting to the King the name of the Prime Minister-elect to be formally appointed, then countersigning it.
 Countersigning the King's appointment of the Leader of the Opposition.
 Being an ex officio member of the Selection committee for:
Constitutional Court Judges
 Election Commissioners
 Ombudsmen
 National Anti-Corruption Commissioners

List of speakers of the House of Representatives

Sources
 Various editions of The Europa World Year Book

References

House of Representatives, Speakers
Thailand